Colobothea elongata is a species of beetle in the family Cerambycidae. It was described by Gahan in 1889. It is known from French Guiana and Brazil.

References

elongata
Beetles described in 1889
Beetles of South America